Life imprisonment is any sentence of imprisonment for a crime under which convicted people are to remain in prison for the rest of their natural lives or indefinitely until pardoned, paroled, or otherwise commuted to a fixed term. Some countries have life imprisonment sentences as 25 years, such as the United States. Crimes for which, in some countries, a person could receive this sentence include murder, torture, terrorism, child abuse resulting in death, rape, espionage, treason, drug trafficking, drug possession, human trafficking, severe fraud and financial crimes, aggravated criminal damage, arson, kidnapping, burglary, and robbery, piracy, aircraft hijacking, and genocide, crimes against humanity, war crimes, severe cases of child pornography, or any three felonies in case of three-strikes law. Life imprisonment (as a maximum term) can also be imposed, in certain countries, for traffic offences causing death. Life imprisonment is not used in all countries; Portugal was the first country to abolish life imprisonment, in 1884.

Where life imprisonment is a possible sentence, there may also exist formal mechanisms for requesting parole after a certain period of prison time. This means that a convict could be entitled to spend the rest of the sentence (until that individual dies) outside prison. Early release is usually conditional on past and future conduct, possibly with certain restrictions or obligations. In contrast, when a fixed term of imprisonment has ended, the convict is free. The length of time served and the conditions surrounding parole vary. Being eligible for parole does not necessarily ensure that parole will be granted. In some countries, including Sweden, parole does not exist but a life sentence may – after a successful application – be commuted to a fixed-term sentence, after which the offender is released as if the sentence served was that originally imposed.

In many countries around the world, particularly in the Commonwealth, courts have the authority to pass prison terms that may amount to de facto life imprisonment. For example, courts in South Africa have handed out at least two sentences that have exceeded a century, while in Tasmania, Australia, Martin Bryant, the perpetrator of the Port Arthur massacre in 1996, received 35 life sentences plus 1,035 years without parole. In the United States, James Holmes, perpetrator of the 2012 Aurora, Colorado shooting, received 12 consecutive life sentences plus 3,318 years without the possibility of parole. In the case of mass murder at the US, Parkland mass murderer Nikolas Cruz was sentenced to 34 consecutive terms of life imprisonment (without parole) for murdering 17 people and injuring another 17 at a school. Any sentence without parole effectively means a sentence cannot be suspended; the prisoner may, however, effectively be released following a pardon, either on appeal, retrial or humanitarian grounds, such as imminent death. In several countries where "de facto" life terms are used, this is commonplace, such as in the case of Abdelbaset al-Megrahi.

A few countries allow for a minor to be given a lifetime sentence with no provision for eventual release; these include but are not limited to: Antigua and Barbuda, Argentina (only over the age of 16), Australia, Belize, Brunei, Cuba, Dominica, Saint Vincent and the Grenadines, the Solomon Islands, Sri Lanka, and the United States. According to a University of San Francisco School of Law study, only the U.S. had minors serving such sentences in 2008. In 2009, Human Rights Watch estimated that there were 2,589 youth offenders serving life sentences without the possibility for parole in the U.S. Since the start of 2020, that number has fallen to 1,465. The United States leads in life sentences (both adults and minors), at a rate of 50 people per 100,000 (1 out of 2,000) residents imprisoned for life.

World view

By country 

In a number of countries, life imprisonment has been effectively abolished. Many of the countries whose governments have abolished both life imprisonment and indefinite imprisonment have been culturally influenced or colonized by Spain or Portugal and have written such prohibitions into their current constitutional laws (including Portugal itself but not Spain).

Europe

A number of European countries have abolished all forms of indefinite imprisonment, including Croatia, Bosnia and Herzegovina, which sets the maximum sentence at 45 years, and Portugal, which abolished all forms of life imprisonment with the prison reforms of Sampaio e Melo in 1884 and sets the maximum sentence at 25 years.

Life imprisonment in Spain was abolished in 1928, but reinstated in 2015 and upheld by the Constitutional Court in 2021.

In Europe, there are many jurisdictions where the law expressly provides for life sentences without the possibility of parole. These are England and Wales (within the United Kingdom; see Life imprisonment in England and Wales), the Netherlands, Moldova, Bulgaria, Italy, Hungary, Malta, Cyprus, Albania, Ukraine, Serbia and the Republic of Ireland.

In Sweden, although the law does not expressly provide for life without the possibility of release, some convicted persons may never be released, on the grounds that they are too dangerous. In Italy, persons that refuse to cooperate with authorities and are sentenced for mafia activities or terrorism are ineligible for parole and thus will spend the rest of their lives in prison. In Austria, life imprisonment will mean imprisonment for the remainder of the offender's life unless clemency is granted by the President of Austria or it can be assumed that the convicted person will not commit any further crimes; the probationary period is ten years. In Malta, there is never any possibility of parole for any person sentenced to life imprisonment, and any form of release from a life sentence is only possible by clemency granted by the President of Malta. In France, while the law does not expressly provide for life imprisonment without any possibility of parole, a court can rule in exceptionally serious circumstances that convicts are ineligible for parole if convicted of child murder involving rape or torture, premeditated murder of a state official or terrorism resulting in death. In Moldova, there is never a possibility of parole for anyone sentenced to life imprisonment, as life imprisonment is defined as "deprivation of liberty of the convict for the entire rest of his/her life". Where mercy is granted in relation to a person serving life imprisonment, imprisonment thereof must not be less than 30 years. In Ukraine, life imprisonment means for the rest of one's life with the only possibilities for release being a terminal illness or a Presidential pardon. In Albania, no person sentenced to life imprisonment is eligible for parole; this effectively means imprisonment for the natural life of the convicted person, unless the prisoner is found not likely to re-offend and has displayed good behavior, and the convicted person has served at least 25 years.

Before 2016 in the Netherlands, there is never a possibility of parole for any person sentenced to life imprisonment, and any form of release for life convicted in the country was only possible when granted royal decree by the King of the Netherlands, with the last granting of a pardon taking place in 1986 when a terminally ill convict was released. As of 1970, the Dutch monarch has pardoned a total of three convicts. Although there is no possibility of parole eligibility, since 2016 prisoners sentenced to life imprisonment in the Netherlands are eligible to have their cases reviewed after serving at least 25 years. This change in law was because the European Court of Human Rights stated in 2013 that a life long imprisonment without the chance of being released is inhuman, three years after that the Netherlands changed their laws on life imprisonment. 

Even in other European countries that do provide for life without parole, courts continue to retain judicial discretion to decide whether a sentence of life should include parole or not. In Albania, the decision of whether or not a life convicted person is eligible for parole is up to the prison complex after 25 years has been served, and release eligibility depends on the prospect of rehabilitation and how likely he or she is to re-offend. In Europe, only the Netherlands, Ukraine, Moldova and Malta explicitly preclude parole or any form of release for life sentences in all cases.

South America

In South and Central America, Honduras, Nicaragua, El Salvador, Costa Rica, Venezuela, Colombia, Uruguay, Bolivia, Ecuador, and the Dominican Republic have all abolished life imprisonment. The maximum sentence is 75 years in El Salvador, 60 years in Colombia, 50 years in Costa Rica and Panama, 40 years in Honduras, 30 years in Nicaragua, Bolivia, Uruguay, and Venezuela, and 25 years in Paraguay and Ecuador. Brazil has a maximum sentence of 40 years under the Penal Code, but life imprisonment and capital punishment are provided by law for military crimes committed during wartime (such as treason, desertion, and mutiny) in the Constitution.

Canada

United States

In 2011, the Supreme Court of the United States ruled that sentencing minors to life without parole, automatically (as the result of a statute) or as the result of a judicial decision, for crimes other than intentional homicide, violated the Eighth Amendment's ban on "cruel and unusual punishments", in the case of Graham v. Florida.

Graham v. Florida was a significant case in juvenile justice. In Jacksonville, Florida, Terrence J. Graham tried to rob a restaurant along with three adolescent accomplices. During the robbery, one of Graham's accomplices had a metal bar that he used to hit the restaurant manager twice in the head. Once arrested, Graham was charged with attempted armed robbery and armed burglary with assault/battery. The maximum sentence he faced from these charges was life without the possibility of parole, and the prosecutor wanted to charge him as an adult. During the trial, Graham pleaded guilty to the charges, resulting in three years of probation, one year of which had to be served in jail. Since he had been awaiting trial in jail, he already served six months and therefore was released after six additional months.

Within six months of his release, Graham was involved in another robbery. Since he violated the conditions of his probation, his probation officer reported to the trial court about his probation violations a few weeks before Graham turned 18 years old. It was a different judge presiding over his trial for the probation violations a year later. While Graham denied any involvement of the robbery, he did admit to fleeing from the police. The trial court found that Graham violated his probation by "committing a home invasion robbery, possessing a firearm, and associating with persons engaged in criminal activity", and sentenced him to 15 years for the attempted armed robbery plus life imprisonment for the armed burglary. The life sentence Graham received meant he had a life sentence without the possibility of parole, "because Florida abolished their parole system in 2003".

Graham's case was presented to the United States Supreme Court, with the question of whether juveniles should receive life without the possibility of parole in non-homicide cases. The Justices eventually ruled that such a sentence violated the juvenile's 8th Amendment rights, protecting them from punishments that are disproportionate to the crime committed, resulting in the abolition of life sentences without the possibility of parole in non-homicide cases for juveniles.

In 2012 the Supreme Court ruled in the case of Miller v. Alabama in a 5–4 decision and with the majority opinion written by Associate Justice Elena Kagan that mandatory sentences of life in prison without parole for juvenile offenders are unconstitutional. The majority opinion stated that barring a judge from considering mitigating factors and other information, such as age, maturity, and family and home environment violated the Eighth Amendment ban on cruel and unusual punishment. Sentences of life in prison without parole can still be given to juveniles for aggravated first-degree murder, as long as the judge considers the circumstances of the case.

In 2016 the Supreme Court ruled in the case of Montgomery v. Louisiana that the rulings imposed by Miller v. Alabama were to apply retroactively. In 2022, the Supreme Court ruled in Jones v. Mississippi that judges do not need to find a minor to be "permanently incorrigible" prior to handing them a sentence of life sentence without parole.

Vatican City

Pope Francis called for the abolition of both capital punishment and life imprisonment in a meeting with representatives of the International Association of Penal Law. He also stated that life imprisonment, removed from the Vatican City penal code in 2013, is just a variation of the death penalty.

Singapore

In Singapore, before 20 August 1997, the law decreed that life imprisonment is a fixed sentence of 20 years with the possibility of one-third reduction of the sentence (13 years and 4 months) for good behaviour. It was an appeal by Abdul Nasir bin Amer Hamsah on 20 August 1997 that led to the law in Singapore to change the definition of life imprisonment into a sentence that lasts the remainder of the prisoner's natural life, with the possibility of parole after at least 20 years. Abdul Nasir was a convicted robber and kidnapper who was, in two separate High Court trials, sentenced to 18 years' imprisonment and 18 strokes of the cane for robbery with hurt resulting in a female Japanese tourist's death at Oriental Hotel in 1994 and a consecutive sentence of life imprisonment with 12 strokes of the cane for kidnapping two police officers for ransom in 1996, which totalled up to 38 years' imprisonment and 30 strokes of the cane. His appeal for the two sentences to run concurrently led to the Court of Appeal of Singapore, which dismissed Abdul Nasir's appeal, to decide that it would be wrong to consider life imprisonment as a fixed jail term of 20 years and thus changed it to a jail term to be served for the rest of the prisoner's remaining lifespan. The amended definition is applied to future crimes committed after 20 August 1997. Since Abdul Nasir committed the crime of kidnapping and was sentenced before 20 August 1997, his life sentence remained as a prison term of 20 years and thus he still had to serve 38 years behind bars. The appeal of Abdul Nasir, titled "Abdul Nasir bin Amer Hamsah v Public Prosecutor [1997] SGCA 38", was since regarded as a landmark in Singapore's legal history as it changed the definition of life imprisonment from "life" to "natural life" under the law.

Overview by jurisdiction

See also

 10-20-Life
 Incapacitation (penology)
 Indefinite imprisonment
 List of prison deaths
 Use of capital punishment by country

Notes

External links
 International perspectives on life imprisonment

 
Sentencing (law)
Penology
Crime-related lists